Asia was launched in 1799 at North Shields. She sailed first as a transport and then as a general trader. She made four voyages (1814–1818) to India under a license from the British East India Company (EIC). She was lost at sea in 1835.

Career
Asia first appeared in Lloyd's Register (LR) in 1799 with Lilbourn, master, Flemming, owner, and trade London transport.

In 1813 the EIC had lost its monopoly on the trade between India and Britain. British ships were then free to sail to India or the Indian Ocean under a license from the EIC.

On 8 June 1814 Captain W. Hall sailed Asia to Bombay under a licensed from the EIC. She was at Portsmouth on 28 June. 

Then on 23 April 1815 Captain Grieg sailed her on a second voyage to Bombay. She returned on 15 January 1816. She had left Bombay on 16 September and had touched at Saint Helena on 23 November. Her round trip had taken eight months and 18 days, something that apparently Lloyd's List (LL) thought worth remarking on. 

On 18 April 1816 Asia, Grieg, master, sailed for Madeira and Bombay. Between 9–15 May she was at Madeira. She arrived back at Gravesend on 16 January 1817.

On 12 April 1817 Asia, Grieg, master, sailed for Madeira and Bombay. On 4 March 1818 Asia was at Ramsgate, having returned from Bombay, when a gale caught her and other vessels there. She was driven on the Dyke with the loss of her rudder. She had previously lost an anchor and cables in the Downs. She was expected to be gotten off.

Fate
On 23 November 1835 Asias register was cancelled as she had been lost at sea.

Citations and references
Citations

References

1799 ships
Age of Sail merchant ships of England